Benjamin Mark Hoyle (born June 1979 in Ashton-under-Lyne, Manchester, United Kingdom) is a Pentecostal Christian pastor in the Assemblies of God in New Zealand.  Ben was the National Youth Director for the Assemblies of God in New Zealand from 2011 – 2016 and from 2004 – 2015 he was the Youth Pastor of Faith City Church in Whanganui, New Zealand, under Senior Pastor Iliafi Esera.  Since 2003, Ben has been the director of New Zealand youth conference Youth Of The Nation.

Biography

Early life 

Born in Ashton-under-Lyne, Greater Manchester in the UK, on June 21, 1979, Ben lived with his parents, elder brother and younger sister in Stockport until his father brought the family to Whanganui, New Zealand, for work, in 1985. During high school, Ben became a leader of the ISCF group until leaving school in 1997. He also went on to become a cabin leader and then camp director at Green Pastures Christian Camp. Also during this time, Ben made Faith City Church A/G his home church. After returning from a trip to the United Kingdom, in 1998, he met Jenna-marie. They would get married in October 2001.

ANODYNe Years 

In October 1998, Ben became the lead singer of Whanganui rock band ANODYNe. Anodyne brought Ben together with good friends Daryl Warburton (Guitar), Joshua Louwrens (Drums) & Clayton Kilmister (Bass guitar). Anodyne performed from 1998 – 2001, doing performances across New Zealand including Parachute Music festival & SamStock in 2000. The band played its last concert in Whanganui in May 2001.

Anodyne put out a CD EP in January 2000 entitled Subtle.

Ministry 

In April 2003, Ben was offered a position on staff at Faith City Church A/G as a youth worker. In 2004, he became the youth director.
Ben Hoyle has stated he has "a passion for unity amongst the body of Christ. Whanganui has a history of church unity, which has opened up opportunities for churches to work together on many occasions." As a member of the Wanganui Christian Youth Workers since 2003, Ben presented the vision to hold a combined city youth conference and in 2004, Youth Of The Nation Conference was born. Ben has continued to be the conference director since the first event.
He also ministers around New Zealand including the Soul Survivor NZ event, Impact Youth Conference, camps & churches.
In 2011, Ben was made the National Youth Facilitator for the Assemblies of God in New Zealand.
Ben became an ordained pastor of the Assemblies of God in New Zealand in 2013.
At the conclusion of 2015, Ben finished up as the Youth Pastor at Faith City Church A/G in Whanganui. Christine Waitai-Rapana was appointed to the role at the commencement of 2016.

It was announced that Ps Ben would be finishing in the National Youth Facilitator role for the Assemblies of God in New Zealand at the end of 2016. Jamie & Rebekah Chapman from Connect Church, Timaru will be succeeding Ben as the National Youth Facilitators.

Family 

Ben & Jenna-marie live in Whanganui, New Zealand.

References

External links 
  – the official Youth Of The Nation Website.
  – the official Faith City Church Website

New Zealand Pentecostals
New Zealand Assemblies of God pastors
1979 births
Living people